American singer Bette Midler has released 13 studio albums, four soundtrack albums, five live albums, one spoken word album, seven greatest hits compilations, four video albums, 39 official singles, nine  promotional singles, and 11 music videos.

Midler released her debut single "Do You Want to Dance" in 1972, which peaked at number 17 on the Billboard Hot 100. Her first album was released the same year, and it managed to sell over 1 million copies in United States being certified platinum by RIAA. After that she released 10 studio albums with Warner Records, the most successful is Some People's Lives, which received gold and platinum certifications in the United States, United Kingdom, Canada, Australia and New Zealand.

After nearly three decades of erratic record sales, Midler was dropped from the Warner Music Group in 2001. Following a reported long-standing feud with Barry Manilow, the two joined forces after many years in 2003 to record Bette Midler Sings the Rosemary Clooney Songbook. Now signed to Columbia Records, the album was an instant success, being certified gold by RIAA. One of the Clooney Songbook selections, "This Ole House", became Midler's first Christian radio single shipped by Rick Hendrix and his positive music movement. The album was nominated for a Grammy the following year. After that she released two more albums with Columbia Records, and in 2014 returned to Warner to release her fourteenth studio album, It's the Girls!.

As of 2010, Midler has sold over 30 million records worldwide.

Albums

Studio albums

Notes
A  Some People's Lives was classified as the 36th best-selling album of 1991 in Australia. In Canada, the set became the 60th most selling album in 1990, while in 1991 it scored at number 36 on the End-of-Year chart.

Soundtracks

Notes
B  Beaches was classified as the 8th best selling album on the Australian End-of-Year Chart for 1989.
C  While the Billboard magazine reports Gypsy charted the highest at number 175 in the US, according to AllMusic the soundtrack peaked at No. 183 on Billboard 200.

Live albums

Spoken word albums

Compilations

Notes
F  Experience the Divine: Greatest Hits was classified as the 28th best selling album on the Australian End-of-Year Chart for 1993 and the 43rd for the year of 1994, respectively.
G  Her 2008 greatest hits set was titled Jackpot! The Best Bette in the US; overseas the compilation was released under the name The Best Bette.

Box sets

Singles

As lead artist

Notes
H  Promotional release of "Do You Want to Dance" was issued in Germany as double A-side single, along with song "Daytime Hustler".
I  "Boogie Woogie Bugle Boy" was released in Germany and Netherlands as a double A-side SP, along with "Chapel of Love".
J  The single "Friends" was issued in the UK only as a promotional single.
K  "In the Mood" as a double A-side single with "Drinking Again", only in France and Netherlands.
L  While in the US "Strangers in the Night" was released as a double A-side single together with "Old Cape Cod", in France the single was issued with French-sung track "Samedi et Vendredi.
M  "Samedi et vendredi" was issued on single only in Italy.
N  In some countries, such as e.g. Canada and France, the song was promoted under title "Day Break (Storybook Children)".
O  "Buckets of Rain", originally released on the 1976's album Songs for the New Depression, was issued later on in the UK to support the import compilation The Best Bette.
P  "Hang on in There Baby" was issued in the US only as a promotional single, and along with "My Knight in Black Leather" as double A-side release.
Q  "My Knight in Black Leather" was released only in Germany, Scandinavian region and Australia.
R  In French-speaking regions, "The Rose" was released as a double A-side SP with track "Stay with Me". In Canada, "The Rose" became the 9th most selling in 1980.
S  "Wind Beneath My Wings" also scored at number 3 on the Canadian Retail Singles and at No. 4 on Irish Singles Chart. Within End-of-Year charts, the title became the 11th best selling single of 1989 in Australia and the 31st in Canada, respectively.
T  "I Know You by Heart" was released as a single only in Australia.
U  "From a Distance" also reached number 3 in Ireland. On the Canadian End-of-Year charts for 1990, the track was classified as the 15th most successful amongst Adult Contemporary songs and the 61st most selling in general, respectively.
V  "Every Road Leads Back to You" was classified as the 73rd from the Top 100 Adult Contemporary tracks of 1992 in Canada.
W  "To Deserve You" charted also at number 14 in Japan, while on the US Dance End-of-Year chart it was classified at No. 45.

As featured artist

Promotional singles

Other appearances

Notes
W  In Harmony: A Sesame Street Record charted at number 156 on the Billboard 200 in the US, and the compilation received a Grammy Award for Best Album for Children in 1981.

Unreleased songs

Videos

Video albums

Notes
X  Diva Las Vegas topped the Australian Music DVD chart in October 1997, and was classified as the 19th most selling DVD in 2005 in Australia.

Music videos

See also
List of number-one hits (United States)
List of number-one dance hits (United States)
List of artists who reached number one on the Hot 100 (U.S.)
List of artists who reached number one on the U.S. Dance chart
List of artists who reached number one on the Australian singles chart
List of Top 25 albums for 1989 in Australia

References
General

Specific

External links
BetteMidler.com > Discography > I Sing (official website)

Discography
Discographies of American artists
Pop music discographies